Helminthophis flavoterminatus is a species of snake in the Anomalepididae family. It is endemic to Colombia and Venezuela.

References

Anomalepididae
Snakes of South America
Reptiles of Colombia
Reptiles of Venezuela
Reptiles described in 1857